Department of Trade and Industry may refer to:

Current

 Department of Trade and Industry (Isle of Man)
 Department of Trade and Industry (Philippines)
 Department of Trade, Industry and Competition (South Africa)

Former

 Department of Trade and Industry (Australia), an Australian Government Department that existed between 1963 and 1972
 Department of Trade and Industry (United Kingdom), a UK department that existed between 1970 and 2007